Abhaypura is a village in Nawa tehsil of Nagaur District of Rajasthan state in India, named after Maharaja Abhay Singh of Marwar.  It was one of the 40 villages in the Princely State Abhaypura which was half of Maroth state and was founded around 1683 AD (1740 BS) by Maharaja Bijay Singh, third son of Maharaja Raghunath Singh Mertia of Panch Mahal Maroth. Later, after a treaty in 1820 AD it became a Thikana (Tributary State) of Marwar and is now called as Thikana Jiliya (where the Royal Family shifted c. 1897 AD) and has 14 villages, as the rest of the villages were given as appanages or jagirs to younger brothers.

References

Villages in Nagaur district